Tetrandrine, a bis-benzylisoquinoline alkaloid, is a calcium channel blocker. It is isolated from the plant Stephania tetrandra, and other Chinese and Japanese herbs.

Pharamacology 
It has anti-inflammatory, immunologic and antiallergenic effects. It inhibits the degranulation of mast cells. It has a quinidine-like anti-arrhythmic effect.  It has vasodilatory properties and can therefore reduce blood pressure. Tetrandrine may have potential use for the treatment of liver disease and liver cancer. Tetrandrine has potential therapeutic value to prevent excess scarring/fibrosis in conjunctiva following trabeculectomy or in patients with severe conjunctival inflammation. Tetrandrine has anti-inflammatory and anti-fibrogenic actions, which make tetrandrine and related compounds potentially useful in the treatment of lung silicosis, liver cirrhosis, and rheumatoid arthritis. Tetrandrine has also been shown to inhibit entry of Ebola virus into host cells in vitro and showed therapeutic efficacy against Ebola in preliminary studies on mice. Tetrandrine has also been studied and patented as a possible treatment for tinnitus.

Biosynthesis
Tetrandrine is biosynthesized from a free radical coupled dimerization of S-N-methylcoclaurine:

Synonyms
Synonyms include fanchinine, hanfangchin A, NSC 77037, (S,S)-(+)-tetrandrine, sinomenine A, TTD, tetrandrin, d-tetrandrine, and GW-201.

References

Calcium channel blockers
Phenol ethers